is the stage name of a line of kabuki actors in Japan.

Lineage
Nakamura Ganjirō I (March 1878 – February 1935): Son of Nakamura Kanjaku III
Nakamura Ganjirō II (January 1947 – April 1983): Son of Ganjirō I. He was active during the golden age of Japanese cinema.
Nakamura Ganjirō III (November 1990 – November 2005): Son of Ganjirō II. He finally took the name of Sakata Tōjūrō IV.
Nakamura Ganjirō IV (January 2015 –): Son of Ganjirō III.

References

Kabuki actors